The Ladder of Lies is a lost 1920 American silent drama film directed by Tom Forman and written by Edith Kennedy and Harold Vickers. The film stars Ethel Clayton, Clyde Fillmore, Jean Acker, Irving Cummings, Charles Meredith, and Ruth Ashby. The film was released on July 11, 1920, by Paramount Pictures.

Cast
Ethel Clayton as Edith Parrish
Clyde Fillmore as Peter Gordon
Jean Acker as Dora Leroy
Irving Cummings as Ralph Brent
Charles Meredith as John Blaine
Ruth Ashby as Maid

References

External links 
 
 

1920 films
1920s English-language films
Silent American drama films
1920 drama films
Paramount Pictures films
Films directed by Tom Forman
Lost American films
American black-and-white films
American silent feature films
1920 lost films
Lost drama films
1920s American films